Gastrotheca stictopleura is a species of frog in the family Hemiphractidae. It is endemic to Peru and known from the southern end of the Cordillera Azul in Huánuco, Pasco, and southern Junín Regions at elevations of  asl.
Its natural habitat is cloud forest, but it can also occur in disturbed forest and pastures with trees. It is threatened by habitat loss caused by agriculture, logging and human settlement.

References

stictopleura
Amphibians of the Andes
Amphibians of Peru
Endemic fauna of Peru
Taxonomy articles created by Polbot
Amphibians described in 2001